Vladislav Grib (Russian: Владислав Валерьевич Гриб; 16 May 1972) is a Russian lawyer and politician. His appointment in June 2016 as a personal representative to the OSCE’s Chairperson-in-Office “on combating racism, xenophobia and discrimination”  has been heavily criticized since he has been accused of rubberstamping the Crimean referendum which took place in Crimea before its annexation by the Russian Federation.

References 

1972 births
Living people
Russian jurists
Russian politicians